This bibliography of Joe Biden is a chronological list of written and published works, by and about Joe Biden. In addition to works authored by Biden, the titles listed here are limited to notable non-fiction books about Biden or his presidency, published by well-known authors, journalists, and scholars. Tertiary sources (including textbooks and juvenile literature), satire, and self-published books are excluded.

By Biden

Books  
 
 
 
 
 
 
 
 
 
 
 
  Also paperback edition, Random House 2008, .

Book contributions

Pamphlets 

 Biden, Joseph R. Jr., and Les Aspin, William Louis Dickinson, Brent Scowcroft (1982). Arms Sales: A Useful Foreign Policy Tool? American Enterprise Institute. AEI Forum 56. Moderated by John Charles Daly.

Articles

About Biden

Focused on Biden

Related to Biden

External links 

 

Bibliographies of presidents of the United States
Books by Joe Biden
Lists of books
Political bibliographies
Works about Joe Biden
Joe Biden-related lists